Nuli Bolagh (also Romanized as Nūlī Bolāgh; also known as Nūlī Bolāghī and Nūly Bolāghī) is a village in Arshaq-e Gharbi Rural District, Moradlu District, Meshgin Shahr County, Ardabil Province, Iran. At the 2006 census, its population was 199, in 37 families.

References 

Towns and villages in Meshgin Shahr County